The Dan'l Webster was a named train of the New York, New Haven and Hartford Railroad (New Haven Railroad) that traveled between Grand Central Terminal, New York, New York, and South Station, Boston, Massachusetts. The Dan'l Webster was an attempt by the New Haven to modernize rail travel and lure people out of their cars. 

The train was built by the Pullman-Standard Car Manufacturing Company to its lightweight Train-X design. It was powered by two streamlined Baldwin-Lima-Hamilton RP-210 diesel-hydraulic locomotives (one on each end of the train), connected by multiple unit control, through the train.

The train, introduced in 1957, consisted of nine, short, all-aluminum cars articulated together. The center car had two axles (one at each end), with the remaining cars having a single axle each, being supported by adjacent cars at the end opposite the axle. The ride was rough, as with most of the other lightweight trains of the period, and the train was not a success.

The train was retired in 1960, and was sold in 1964 to Jones Tours (owned by the Pickens Railway), for excursion service. After a long period of storage in South Carolina, the train and locomotives were scrapped around 1970.

Operations 
(The entire text printed here is taken directly from its original Wikipedia entry - Baldwin RP-210)

The Pullman-Standard Car Manufacturing Company delivered the Dan'l Webster to the New Haven Railroad in early October 1956. The New Haven then began test runs on its Shoreline Route between Boston and New York. The last 12.8 miles of the westbound trip saw trains passing through the third-rail electrified Harlem Division of the New York Central Railroad. The final three miles of this route was through the railroad's Park Avenue tunnel into Grand Central Terminal. Here the RP-210 locomotive was required to shut down its diesel engine and utilize electric traction motors.

To meet the need for dual-powered operation, the New Haven's Bronx-based Van Nest electrical shops initially fitted the Baldwin units with one third-rail contact-shoe per side, bolted to a reinforced journal box bracket on the lead axle of the locomotive's rear truck. This placement was necessitated by the unusually wide gap between the axles on the locomotive's front truck in the diesel-hydraulic design. 

However, experience had shown that a locomotive required two power collection shoes per side, as widely spaced as possible.  This allowed for one of them to fail, and also limited the possibility that (if the train was suddenly forced to stop) the locomotive's contact-shoe might be short of the next section of energized 3rd-rail. 

The reduced power of the RP-210's small traction motors (300-hp), having only the front or rear locomotive unit of the Dan'l Webster positioned to draw 3rd-rail power, would have made it difficult to accelerate the train (approximately 390 tons with passengers) from a standing stop. It might have been necessary to start the RP-210 diesel engine to move it to the next section of available trackside power. However, that would have violated a New York City ordinance requiring exhaust-free motive power in the terminal and tunnels.

The Van Nest engineers and mechanics therefore scrambled to design a full-length support bracket for the RP-210's lead truck, and attached a rather unconventional contact-shoe assembly to it. The work was completed just prior to the pre-inaugural press run of the train, scheduled for January 7, 1956, with regular service to commence the following day.  The electrical shop supervisors advised against putting the new 3rd-rail shoes into service without proper testing but were overruled by a superior.      

On January 7, the Dan'l Webster left Boston with New Haven president, George Alpert, and about 225 newsmen, promoters, politicians, and railroad managers aboard for the press-run.  Things went well enough until the train merged from New Haven's track #1 to New York Central's track #2, opposite JO tower at Woodlawn Junction in the North Bronx. 

There a contact-shoe on the aft RP-210 unit misaligned with the underside of the 3rd-rail, as it passed through the switch-point.  The damaged contact scraped along the energized rail, creating a ground arc of electricity which set the locomotive's truck ablaze and began to melt away the aluminum side-skirting above it.

The train then made an emergency stop on the southbound express track at Woodlawn station.  New York Police and Fire Department units were called to the scene and mainline service was disrupted for two hours.  Minus the rear RP-210 locomotive and the last coach (which could not be detached, due to fire damage), the rest of the Dan'l Webster eventually proceeded on to Grand Central in New York City. 

While being towed back to Van Nest shops by a switcher engine, the lightweight coach attached to the damaged locomotive derailed near Pelham station in Westchester County, resulting in an additional four-hour delay for evening commuters. On January 21, Time magazine crowned the public relations fiasco with a national news story titled, "The Devil & Dan'l Webster".  

The lightweight train's inaugural service run was postponed until March 25, and the RP-210 units underwent further modifications to their 3rd-rail power contacts.  A larger and more traditional mechanism, which the New Haven had regularly fastened to the journal boxes of their electric locomotives, was modified to fit the front and rear trucks.  Winter testing saw some complications due to snow and icing, but this wasn't unexpected with 3rd-rail operations, and could be viewed as abating with a change of season.

One more electric traction challenge remained. Between 47th and 59th streets, the complexity of Grand Central's roadbed switching did not allow for an unbroken length of trackside 3rd-rail. So when the electrification was designed in 1905, an energized overhead rail was put in place to fill these power gaps. All New Haven and New York Central electric locomotives operating into the terminal were equipped with a small spring-tension roof-pantograph, mounted on a telescoping pole which extended to the overhead power supply.

Standing only 11 feet tall (about 2 feet shorter than average), the low-slung Baldwin locomotives again presented a problem not previously encountered.  The traditional roof-mounted pantograph could not telescope far enough to reach the overhead 660-volt DC power rail. 

New Haven's Van Nest engineers realized that a small diamond-style pantograph (transport) would be needed to attain the required height.  They found their solution perched atop Boston's Blue Line (MBTA) Revere Extension subway cars. 

However, the train struggled with poor riding qualities and numerous mechanical issues, including transmission overheating in its Maybach diesel-hydraulic powertrain. Road mechanics were unfamiliar with the foreign prime mover, and reported having to forage for metric hardware components at local Volkswagen dealerships. The Maybach maintenance-manuals supplied for the diesel engines were only available in German.

Engine troubles were compounded by continuing difficulties in positioning and maintaining the 3rd-rail contacts. This resulted in the Dan'l Webster being shifted to the railroad's non-electrified Springfield Route (New Haven-Hartford-Springfield) as the winter of 1958 approached. The train lasted less than 15 months in service, from March 25, 1957, until June 5, 1958.

Baldwin-Lima-Hamilton delivered the RP-210s to the New Haven Railroad a month before General Motor's Electro-Motive Diesel (EMD) division in Illinois completed the first production model of the EMD FL-9 Electric-Diesel-Electric-Road locomotive (EDER in New Haven terminology). The FL-9 would prove to be everything that the RP-210 was not. Over the next four years, the New Haven took delivery of sixty units. The railroad retired the last of these from mainline operations in 2009, after a half-century of service.

Notes

References 

 
 

Articulated passenger trains
North American streamliner trains
Passenger trains of the New York, New Haven and Hartford Railroad
Named passenger trains of the United States
Railway services introduced in 1957